Geane Hohipuha is a former netball player who represented New Zealand on ten occasions.

Netball career
Geane Hohipuha (née Katae) was born on 16 June 1960. She married Raymond Hohipuha and they had five children. Having played for Canterbury, she was the 68th woman to be selected to play for the Silver Ferns, the New Zealand national netball team and made her first appearance in 1979 against Saint Lucia in the 1979 World Netball Championships, which were held in Port of Spain, Trinidad and Tobago. That tournament resulted in a three-way tie for first place between New Zealand, Australia and the hosts. Hohipuha was also a member of the team that played Australia and England in 1982. She played in the Goal shooter (GS), Goal attack (GA) and Wing attack (WA) positions.

References

1960 births
Living people
New Zealand international netball players
1979 World Netball Championships players
New Zealand netball players